Four Fs may stand for:
 Four Fs (evolution), "fighting, fleeing, feeding, and fornicating"
 Four Fs (legal), "fruit, fungi, flowers, and foliage"
 Four Fs as applied in military parlance, "find, fix, flank, and finish"
 Friedrich Ludwig Jahn's "frisch, fromm, fröhlich, frei" ("fresh, pious, cheerful, free")

See also
4F (disambiguation)
F4 (disambiguation)